Charles Milne Usher (26 September 1891 – 21 January 1981, Haddington) was a Scottish rugby union player, who played at number eight, and also captained . He was capped sixteen times between 1912 and 1922 (partly due to the hiatus caused by World War I).

Because of this, he has one of the longest international careers on record.

See also
 Jock Wemyss, who also played on both sides of the war.

References
 Bath, Richard (ed.) The Scotland Rugby Miscellany (Vision Sports Publishing Ltd, 2007 )
 Jones, J.R. Encyclopedia of Rugby Union Football (Robert Hale, London, 1976 )
profile at scrum.com

1891 births
1981 deaths
Scottish rugby union players
Scotland international rugby union players
Rugby union players from Edinburgh
Edinburgh Wanderers RFC players